Empire Coal Company Store was a historic company store building located at Landgraff, McDowell County, West Virginia.  It was a one- to two-story frame building on a brick foundation with a hipped roof.

It was listed on the National Register of Historic Places in 1992.  The building has been demolished.

References

Commercial buildings on the National Register of Historic Places in West Virginia
National Register of Historic Places in McDowell County, West Virginia
Demolished buildings and structures in West Virginia
Company stores in the United States
U.S. Route 52